Cherthala South is a village in Alappuzha district in the Indian state of Kerala.

Demographics
 India census, Cherthala South had a population of 24538 with 12079 males and 12459 females. Areepparambu is the headquarters of this village. The Thiruvizha Mahadevar Temple situated in Southern boarder of Cherthala South village. Thiruvizha Railway station is also located near this temple.

References

Villages in Alappuzha district